Ganjali or Genjeli may refer to:

 Ganjali, Khachmaz, Azerbaijan
 Ganjali, Salyan, Azerbaijan
 Genjeli, Chermik, Turkey